Rineloricaria altipinnis is a species of catfish in the family Loricariidae. It is native to Central America, where it occurs in the Chico River basin in Panama. The species reaches 15.4 cm (6.1 inches) in standard length and is believed to be a facultative air-breather.

References 

Loricariidae
Fish described in 1925
Fish of Panama